Werner Braun (12 June 1918 – 25 December 2018) was an Israeli photographer, considered a founder of photojournalism in Israel.

Biography
Werner Brown was born in Nuremberg, Germany. Braun started to take photos at the age of 18. With the rise of the Nazi regime, he left Germany in 1937, first to Denmark and then to Sweden. He was able to migrate to Mandatory Palestine in 1946.

Awards
 1979 Third Prize, Nikon International Contest 
 1989 Enrique Kavlin Life Achievement Award for Photography. Israel Museum
 2007 Lifetime Achievement Award. The Audio-Visual Conservation Forum in Israel

Exhibitions

Gallery

References

1918 births
2018 deaths
Israeli centenarians
Men centenarians
Israeli journalists
Artists from Nuremberg
Place of death missing
Jewish emigrants from Nazi Germany to Mandatory Palestine